The First State Bank Building in Revillo, South Dakota was built in 1905.  It was listed on the National Register of Historic Places in 1987.

It was designed in commercial Romanesque Revival style by architect E.R. Bogardus, with brick corbelling, a corner front entrance, and long rectangular windows, and it cost $3,843.00 to build.

References

Bank buildings on the National Register of Historic Places in South Dakota
Commercial buildings completed in 1905
Buildings and structures in Grant County, South Dakota
National Register of Historic Places in Grant County, South Dakota
1905 establishments in South Dakota
Unused buildings in South Dakota